Żanna Słoniowska (born in Lviv, 1978) is a Polish novelist and journalist. She was the first winner of the Znak literary prize for her novel The House with the Stained-Glass Window and a Conrad Prize winner.

Biography
Słoniowska was born in Lviv in 1978, in a family with Polish antecedents. She attended the Ukrainian Academy of Printing, following which she worked as a journalist for the television channel NTA.

In 2002, she moved to Poland. She began doctoral studies in Warsaw's University of Social Sciences and Humanities. After her marriage, she moved to Krakow.

In 2013, she published a historical work The most beautiful photographs of pre-war Lviv, illustrated with fine photographs. The following year, her debut novel The House with the Stained-Glass Window was published.

Awards and recognition

The House with the Stained-Glass Window (Dom z Witrażem)
 Znak publishing house's prize for best novel 
 Conrad prize for new writers, 
 Shortlisted for the Nike Award in 2016.

Reception

For Dom z Witrażem
A reviewer in Polityka said that "the grandeur of the book is impressive - through a small family saga it depicts the history of Ukraine over the last hundred years". Another called it "a tale saturated with vivid colors, paintings, dreamy moments, ... it is, above all, a moving and insightful saga about women, entangled in history."

Selected works

External links

References 

1978 births
Writers from Lviv
Polish women novelists
Polish journalists
Polish women journalists
Living people
21st-century Polish novelists
SWPS University alumni
21st-century Polish women writers